The Sigma Alpha Epsilon Building is a historic Sigma Alpha Epsilon fraternity house located near the University of Missouri at Columbia, Missouri.  It was built about 1908 to house the Welch Military Academy and took its present form in 1929; it was restored in 1965-1966 after a fire. It is a -story, "T"-plan, Neo-Classical Revival style brick building.  The front facade features a central pedimented portico with six two-story stone Ionic order columns.

The property was added to the National Register of Historic Places in 2014.

References

Sigma Alpha Epsilon
University and college buildings on the National Register of Historic Places in Missouri
Neoclassical architecture in Missouri
Residential buildings completed in 1929
Buildings and structures in Columbia, Missouri
National Register of Historic Places in Boone County, Missouri
Fraternity and sorority houses